The Scottish Conservative & Unionist Party, often known simply as the Scottish Conservatives and colloquially as the Scottish Tories, is a centre-right political party in Scotland. It is the second-largest party in the Scottish Parliament and the third-largest in Scottish local government. The party has the second-largest number of Scottish MPs in the House of Commons of the United Kingdom and the seventh overall.

The Leader of the party is Douglas Ross. He replaced Jackson Carlaw, who briefly served from February to July 2020; Carlaw had in turn taken over from Ruth Davidson, who held the post from 2011 to 2019. The party has no Chief Whip at Westminster, which is instead represented by the Chief Whip of the Conservative Party in England.

In the 2017 UK general election, the party increased its number of MPs to 13 on 28.6 percent of the popular vote – its best performance since 1983 and in terms of votes since 1979 – but it fell back to six Westminster seats in 2019. In the 2016 election for the Scottish Parliament the Scottish Conservatives gained 16 seats, making it the largest opposition party, with 31 of 129 seats. In the 2021 election for the Scottish Parliament the Scottish Conservatives maintained 31 seats and remained the largest opposition party.

History

Scottish Conservatism pre-1912
Before 1912, the Conservative Party operated in Scotland. With the emergence of mass party political groups in the second half of the 19th century, distinct organisations emerged in Scotland. The voluntary party organisation, the National Union of Conservative Associations for Scotland (mirroring the National Union of Conservative Associations), emerged in 1882, creating a distinct Conservative conference in Scotland.

A previous organisation, the Scottish National Constitutional Association, existed from 1867, with the patronage of UK party leader Benjamin Disraeli. The Scotsman newspaper reported that following the 1874 election "Conservative Clubs and Working Men's Conservative Associations have spring up like mushrooms in all parts of [Scotland]".

From the Representation of the People Act 1884 until 1918, the Liberal Party was the dominant political force in Scotland, operating in a largely two-party system with the Scottish Conservatives. In 1886, the Liberal Unionists had broken away from the Liberal Party in opposition to William Gladstone's proposals for Irish Home Rule. Joint Liberal Unionist and Conservative candidates were run across the United Kingdom, but with the organisations of these parties remaining separate.

The Unionist Party (1912–1965)

Following the merger of the Conservatives and Liberal Unionists to create the modern Conservative and Unionist Party in England and Wales, a committee was formed of the National Union of Conservative Associations for Scotland and regional Liberal Unionist associations which recommended a merger in Scotland. This was agreed in December 1912, creating the Scottish Unionist Association and the Unionist Party.

From 1918 and through the 1920s, the Labour Party became more prominent, displacing the Liberals as one of the two main parties in Scottish politics. The Unionist Party had a number of electoral successes, topping the poll in Scotland in a number of elections from the 1930s to 1950s. During the period of its existence, the Unionist Party produced two Prime Ministers of the United Kingdom – Bonar Law and Alec Douglas-Home – and uniquely among parties in the post-war period, achieved more than half of the popular vote within Scotland in the 1931 general election and 1955 general election. The majority of the vote achieved in these two General Elections was combined with the National Liberal Party who later merged with the Conservative and Unionist Party in 1968 alongside the Unionist Party which had already merged into the Conservative and Unionist Party in 1965.

While taking the Conservative whip in the House of Commons, the Unionist Party had a lengthy "unionist-nationalist" tradition, emphasising its Scottish identity within the United Kingdom and the British Empire. This was represented by elected members such as John Buchan (who said "I believe every Scotsman should be a Scottish nationalist")  and those former Unionists who in 1932 founded the pro-home rule Scottish Party (which later merged with the National Party of Scotland to form the Scottish National Party).

Scottish Conservative and Unionist Party
Following a decline in performance, coming second to the Labour Party in seats through first in votes at the 1959 general election and both votes and seats at the 1964 general election, the Unionist Party proposed a number of reforms which involved amalgamation with the Conservative and Unionist Party in England and Wales – taking place in 1965. The modern Scottish Conservative and Unionist Party, as part of the wider UK Conservative Party, came into existence from this point.

However its electoral fortunes continued to decline throughout the 1960s. Following Harold Wilson's failure to obtain a Labour majority in February 1974, a second general election was held in October of the same year which saw the party decline to below 25% of the vote and drop from 21 seats to 16. At the same time, the SNP were to gain an unprecedented 11 MPs, unseating a number of Conservative MPs in rural constituencies.

The party's fortunes recovered somewhat in 1979 under the leadership of Margaret Thatcher, but her tenure as Prime Minister was to see the party's fortunes drop further from holding 22 seats in 1979 to 10 in 1987. The party increased its share of the vote and number of MPs to 11 in 1992 under John Major's leadership before dropping to 17.5% of the popular vote and failing to have any MPs returned from Scotland in 1997. It continued to return only a single MP from Scottish constituencies at the 2001, 2005, 2010 and 2015 general elections, before winning 13 seats in 2017.

Following the 2010 general election performance, the party commissioned a review under Lord Sanderson of Bowden to consider the party's future organisation. The Sanderson Commission's report recommended a single Scottish leader (replacing a leader of the Scottish Parliamentary group), reforms to governance and constituency structures, the creation of regional campaigning centres, greater focus on policy development and a new membership and fundraising drive.

Scottish devolution

The party's commitments to a devolved Scottish Assembly were to decline under the leadership of Margaret Thatcher. Previously the party had offered some support for a Scottish Assembly, including in the so-called Declaration of Perth in 1968 under UK party leader Edward Heath. John Major, while endorsing further powers for the Scottish Grand Committee and the Scottish Office did not support a devolved parliament. With the Labour Party's victory in 1997, referendums on devolution were organised in Scotland and Wales, both receiving agreement that devolved legislatures should be formed.

In 1999, the first elections to a devolved Scottish Parliament were held. Following the Conservatives electoral wipe-out in Scotland in 1997, devolution provided the party with a number of parliamentary representatives in Scotland. Less than a year following the first Scottish Parliament election, a 2000 by-election was held in the Ayr constituency with John Scott winning the seat from Labour.

In the party leadership elections in 2011, the previous deputy leader Murdo Fraser proposed disbanding the party and creating a new Scottish party of the centre-right, similar to the previous Unionist Party and compared this arrangement to the relationship between the Christian Social Union in Bavaria and the Christian Democratic Union in Germany. The move was opposed by the other three candidates. Victory went to the newly elected MSP Ruth Davidson who suggested that she would oppose further devolution beyond the new powers proposed by the Calman Commission.

The party was one of the three main Scottish political parties to join in the Better Together campaign opposing Scotland becoming independent in the 2014 Scottish independence referendum. Although a Conservative majority government was returned in Westminster in the 2015 general election, David Mundell remained their only MP elected in Scotland and was appointed Secretary of State for Scotland. He replaced Liberal Democrat incumbents who served during the 2010–15 Coalition government. The UK Government set about implementing the recommendations of the cross-party Smith Commission.

Recent elections

2011 Scottish Parliament election
Annabel Goldie led the party into the 2011 Scottish Parliament election, having successfully campaigned in budget negotiations with the minority SNP Scottish Government for a number of concessions over the 2007–11 Scottish Parliament. This had resulted in commitments to 1,000 extra police officers, four-year council tax freeze and £60m town regeneration fund.

With an SNP majority delivered, the Scottish Conservatives were reduced from 17 seats to 15, losing the Edinburgh Pentlands constituency to the SNP, seeing notional loses in Eastwood and Dumfriesshire to Labour. Following the election, Annabel Goldie resigned as leader and a leadership election was held in November 2011 – the first to appoint a Leader of the Scottish Conservatives, rather than the Scottish Parliament group, as required by the Sanderson Commission. Ruth Davidson was returned, beating the original front-runner and former deputy leader Murdo Fraser.

Davidson drove forward a number of the Sanderson Commission's reforms, including replacing the party's Banyan (or Indian Fig) tree logo with a "union saltire".

2015 UK general election
The Conservatives made little advance at the 2015 UK general election compared to 2010, with Scotland's sole Conservative MP David Mundell holding on to his Dumfriesshire, Clydesdale and Tweeddale constituency with a reduced majority of just 798 votes ahead of the SNP's Emma Harper. The Conservatives made no seat gains at the election in Scotland, with Conservative targets such as Argyll and Bute; West Aberdeenshire and Kincardine and Angus being won by the Scottish National Party with an increased majority compared to 2010. In spite of this, the Conservatives narrowly missed out on having 2 MP's elected in Scotland, missing out in the Berwickshire, Roxburgh and Selkirk constituency by only 328 votes behind the SNP's Calum Kerr: this was the most marginal result in Scotland and the eighth most marginal result in the United Kingdom.

2016 Scottish Parliament election

At the 2016 Scottish Parliament election the Scottish Conservative campaign focused on providing strong opposition to the SNP government in Scotland, opposing calls for a second referendum on Scottish independence. The party manifesto focused on freezing business tax rates to promote economic growth and greater employment opportunities; investing in mental health treatment over the course of the next parliament; a commitment to building 100,000 affordable homes within 5 years and a re-introduction of the Right to Buy scheme in Scotland. The Scottish Conservatives were the only major party in Scotland to oppose higher taxes to the rest of the United Kingdom during the campaign as tax reductions came in force across the rest of the UK which were opposed by the SNP, Labour and Liberal Democrats.

At the election the party saw major gains, particularly on the regional list vote. The Conservatives doubled their representation in the Scottish Parliament by taking 31 seats (compared to 15 in 2011), making them the leading opposition party in the Scottish Parliament ahead of Scottish Labour. On the constituency element of the vote the Conservatives held on to their three first past the post constituency seats (Ayr; Ettrick, Roxburgh and Berwickshire and Galloway and West Dumfries), making gains in Aberdeenshire West; Dumfriesshire; Eastwood and Edinburgh Central, where party leader Ruth Davidson stood for election. This marked the party's best electoral performance in Scotland since the 1992 UK general election.

2017 UK general election

Campaigning in opposition to proposals put forward by Nicola Sturgeon and the Scottish Parliament for a second referendum on Scottish independence to be held following the United Kingdom's decision to leave the European Union in a referendum held in 2016 which was not supported by a majority of Scottish voters, the Scottish Conservatives had their best ever election in Scotland in seat terms since 1983 at the 2017 general election. The Conservatives gained 12 MP's in Scotland to give them 13 in total. The party had their largest vote share in a general election in Scotland since 1979, taking a total of 757,949 votes (28.6%) in Scotland.

David Mundell held on to his Dumfrieesshire, Clydesdale and Tweeddale seat with an increased majority of 9,441 votes (19.3%). The party also gained the Ayr, Carrick and Cumnock; Berwickshire, Roxburgh and Selkirk; and Dumfries and Galloway constituencies to the south of the country, and gained East Renfrewshire on the outskirts of Glasgow.

The Conservatives also took a majority of seats in the North East of Scotland, gaining former First Minister of Scotland Alex Salmond's Gordon constituency, alongside Moray, the seat of the SNP's Westminster leader Angus Robertson. Other gains for the party in the North East included Aberdeen South; Angus; Banff and Buchan; and West Aberdeenshire and Kincardine. The party took the Ochil and South Perthshire; and Stirling constituencies in central Scotland and missed out to the SNP in Perth and North Perthshire by just 21 votes.

2019 European elections 
The Scottish Conservatives retained their single seat in the European Parliament at the 2019 European Parliament election. Incumbent MEP Nosheena Mobarik was reelected.

2019 UK general election 
On 29 August 2019, Davidson stood down citing several political and personal reasons for her decision to resign as leader.

The Scottish Conservatives lost more than half of their seats in Scotland to the Scottish National Party in the December 2019 general election, with a 3.5% swing away from the party.
The lost seats were Aberdeen South; Angus; Ayr, Carrick and Cumnock; East Renfrewshire; Gordon; Ochil and South Perthshire; and Stirling.

2021 Scottish Parliament election 
Douglas Ross led the Scottish Conservatives into the 2021 Scottish Parliament election. The party lost two constituencies it was defending (Ayr and Edinburgh Central) to the SNP but retained the remainder of its constituency seats with an increased vote share in some which political analysts attributed in-part to tactical voting from Unionists and credited this with preventing the SNP from gaining an overall majority. The Scottish Conservatives also came close to winning Banffshire and Buchan Coast. The party also saw its highest result to date on the regional list with 23.5% of the vote, while losing 0.1% in the constituency vote. The Scottish Conservatives ultimately obtained 31 seats, the same as their result in the 2016 election, and remained in opposition at Holyrood.

2022 Scottish local elections 
The Scottish Conservatives lost 63 seats at the 2022 Scottish local elections, shedding 5.6% of the vote and taking their total first preference vote to 19.7% in what was their worst performance electorally in nearly a decade. Some of their heaviest loses occurred in Glasgow, where their total representation went from 8 councillors to 2, and Perth & Kinross, where they lost 3 councillors and control of the council to The Scottish National Party. They also lost control of East Dunbartonshire and Angus, where they were in coalition with the Scottish Liberal Democrats, again to The Scottish National Party, who attracted a record share of the vote and councillors across Scotland. Douglas Ross blamed the poor performance on Partygate, while others said his leadership was partly to blame, due to his unclear stance on whether he supported Boris Johnson remaining in office or not.

Low polling and internal rumblings
Following the 2022 Local Elections, The Scottish Conservatives fortunes did not turn around. Much like the UK wide Conservative Party, the party have been struggling with low polling following Boris Johnson and Liz Truss' premiership controversies, with two polls in December 2022 showing support for the party plummeting to 13%, behind Scottish Labour who were averaging 25% and The Scottish National Party averaging 50%, along with rising support for Scottish Independence.
Douglas Ross' leadership authority suffered due to him u-turning on a number of policies, including scrapping the 45p tax rate, which he supported then supported the scrapping of the policy. Scottish Conservative MSP's were reported to have wanted to oust him due to the low polling and multiple u-turns, but it was subsequently revealed there isn't a mechanism in place for the Scottish Conservatives to oust their leader.

Policies and ideology 
The Scottish Conservatives are a centre-right and conservative political party, with a commitment to Scotland remaining a part of the United Kingdom. It is autonomous from the UK Conservative Party in its leadership, internal structure and the creation of policy in devolved areas. In August 2006, the-then Leader of the Conservative Party, David Cameron, said that the party should recognise "that the policies of Conservatives in Scotland and Wales will not always be the same as our policies in England" and that the "West Lothian question must be answered from a Unionist perspective". Presently, the Scottish Conservatives refer to themselves as a "patriotic, unionist party of the Scottish centre-right" that stands for "Scotland’s place in the UK, equal opportunity, enterprise and growth, localism and community and the rights of victims and the police in our justice system."

Although aligned to the UK-wide Conservatives, it has in certain areas adopted different policy positions. Following the Sutherland Report in 1999, the party voted with the Scottish Executive in 2002 to introduce free personal care for the elderly funded from general taxation.

Like Scottish Labour and the Scottish Liberal Democrats, the Scottish Conservatives are opposed to Scottish independence but have often been regarded as the most staunchly pro-Unionist of the three parties. Generally, the Scottish Conservatives want to create a more business friendly environment in Scotland, increase funding for the police and frontline workers, enact stricter law & order policies to tackle violent crime, drug and alcohol misuse, and give more support to Scotland's rural communities. The party has evolved to support Scottish devolution but has argued successive SNP administrations in Scotland have not made a constructive use of devolved powers to benefit ordinary people and have encouraged waste or corruption through devolution. Although opposed to policies that could further Scottish independence, the Scottish Conservatives support aspects of financial devolution and devolving more powers to local communities in Scotland.

At the 2019 general election, the Scottish Conservatives pledged opposition to a proposed second Scottish independence referendum, delivering on Brexit and to strengthen the United Kingdom. They lost half their seats at the election. In 2021, ahead of the Scottish Parliament elections, the party argued that Scotland should focus on economic recovery following the COVID-19 pandemic.

Party organisation 
The Party is governed by a Party Management Board convened by the Party Chairman, currently Craig Hoy MSP. The Management Board also consists of the party leader, conference convener, honorary secretary, treasurer and three regional conveners representing the north, east and west of Scotland areas. These are:

 Craig Hoy MSP, Chairman of the Scottish Conservative & Unionist Party
 Douglas Ross MP MSP, Leader of the Scottish Conservative & Unionist Party
 Leonard Wallace, Honorary Secretary
 Hamish Mair, Treasurer
 Charles Kennedy, Conference Convener
 Anne Connell, East of Scotland Regional Convener
 Gillian Tebberen, North of Scotland Regional Convener
 Lynne Nailon, West of Scotland Regional Convener

The party leader is elected by members on a one-member-one-vote basis, with the chairman appointed by the Scottish leader after consultation with the UK party leader. The Conference convener is a voluntary officer elected by members at the party's annual conference who must have been a former regional convener, and is responsible for chairing the conference and the party's convention.

Leader of the Scottish Conservative Party 
The position of Leader of the Scottish Conservative Party was created in 2011. The new position of Scottish party leader was created following the recommendations of the Sanderson Commission. The position of leader is currently held by Douglas Ross.

Leader of the Scottish Conservative Party in the Scottish Parliament 
The position of Leader of the Scottish Conservative Party in the Scottish Parliament was originally created in 1999 and used until 2011 when the position of Leader of the Scottish Conservative Party was created. However, as a result of Douglas Ross being appointed as Leader of the Scottish Conservative Party in August 2020 and then not being a MSP but instead being an MP within the House of Commons, Ruth Davidson took on the role of Leader of the Scottish Conservative Party in the Scottish Parliament at First Ministers Questions.

Deputy Leader of the Scottish Conservative Party 
The position of Deputy Chairman of the Scottish Conservative Party was held by Jackson Carlaw from 1992 to 1998 and Annabel Goldie from 1998 until her election as leader in 2005, after which the position listed below was created. The deputy leadership position was abolished shortly after Douglas Ross was appointed Scottish Conservative leader but was reinstated following on from the Scottish Conservative's poor performance at the 2022 Scottish local elections where Meghan Gallacher was given the position.

Central staff
The party's registered headquarters is at Scottish Conservative Central Office (SCCO), 67 Northumberland Street, Edinburgh. Between 2001 and 2010, SCCO was housed in an office on Princes Street.

The party's central staff is headed by the Director of the Party, currently James Tweedie, who serves as its chief executive. There are also three campaign managers appointed to three defined regions of Scotland.

Scottish Parliament Shadow Cabinet 
The front bench formulates the party's policy on issues devolved to the Scottish Parliament.

Appointments

House of Lords

Electoral performance
In 2017, the Scottish Conservatives became the second-largest political party in Scotland in terms of democratic representation in the Scottish Parliament (following the 2016 Scottish Parliament election), constituencies in Scotland in the UK House of Commons (following the 2017 snap election) and in local government in Scotland (following the 2017 local elections), finishing in second place behind the Scottish National Party and overtaking the once dominant Scottish Labour.

House of Commons

Scottish Parliament

Local councils

District councils

Regional councils

European Parliament

See also 

Scottish Unionist Party (1912–1965)
Scottish Unionist Party (1986)
Conservative Future Scotland
Elections in Scotland
Northern Ireland Conservatives
Welsh Conservatives

References

Further reading 
The Scottish Conservative and Unionist Party: 'the lesser spotted Tory'? (PDF file), Dr David Seawright, School of Politics and International Studies, University of Leeds, Paper presented at the Annual Conference of the Political Studies Association, University of Aberdeen, 5–7 April 2002
The Decline of the Scottish Conservative and Unionist Party 1950–1992: Religion, Ideology or Economics?, David Seawright and John Curtice, Centre for Research into Elections and Social Trends, University of Oxford, Working Paper Number 33, February 1995
 Smith, Alexander Thomas T. 2011 Devolution and the Scottish Conservatives: banal activism, electioneering and the politics of irrelevance Manchester: Manchester University Press

External links 

 
1965 establishments in Scotland
Political parties established in 1965
Organisations based in Edinburgh
Unionism in Scotland